Shen Tong (Simplified Chinese: 沈彤; Hanyu Pinyin: Shěn Tóng) (born 1968) is an American impact investor, activist, and writer. He founded business accelerators FoodFutureCo in 2015 and Food-X in 2014, the latter of which is recognized by Fast Company as one of "The World's Top 10 Most Innovative Companies of 2015 in Food". He was a Chinese dissident who was exiled as one of the student leaders in the democracy movement at Tiananmen Square in 1989. Shen was one of the People of the Year in Newsweek 1989, and he became a media, software, social entrepreneur, and investor in the late 1990s. He serves on the board of Food Tank.

Personal background
Shen Tong was born in 1968, in Beijing. He studied at Peking University from 1986 to 1989, and was one of the student leaders during the 1989 Tiananmen Square protests. He lives in New York City along with his three children. His father and sister Shen Qing both went to Peking University, and his mother is a medical doctor.

Business and media ventures
Shen moved from Massachusetts to New York, and since 2000 focused more on creative writing and businesses with impact and purpose. He founded Food-X and FoodFutureCo in New York City while collaborating with Dan Barber, Dorothy Cann Hamilton, Michael Moss, and Michel Nischan.  He has several dozen publicly known commercial and impact investments.

He was the founder and president of the now defunct VFinity, company which made software tools and web applications for multimedia and multilingual search, media production, archiving, and media distribution. The founding idea was based on two patents. He is known for his promotion of "Context Media" partially due to his keynote speech at a super session of National Association of Broadcasters in Las Vegas, 2007.  He founded the TV production company B&B Media Production and invested in bookstores and publishing in Beijing. B&B Media Production had created and produced several highly circulated and acclaimed TV programs, including the national weekend primetime show Tell It Like It Is during its first season.

Shen Tong is a serial Entrepreneur since 1990s and impact investor with more than fifty investments in food, media, and other high-tech ventures. He is currently the founder and Managing Partner of FoodFutureCo, the food business accelerator and impact investment fund that focuses on scale-up stage food and agriculture disruptions.

Shen’s portfolio of good food and sustainable agriculture holdings includes over 50 investments in 40 companies and continues to grow. His other social entrepreneurship portfolio includes companies such as WeFunder. His thesis of cultivating tasty, sustainable, healthy, accessible, and affordable food and agriculture businesses is explained in his TEDx Talk in addition to numerous speeches at Fancy Food Show, Esca Bona, Vitagora, Concordia, James Beard Foundation, Food Tank, Seed to Chips, Harvard Business School, BevNet, etc. The companies Shen has founded or co-founded have had numerous financial exits including VFinity, DCF, B&B Media, and GA Media.  Two other financial exits came from his venture investments.  He works with social entrepreneurs to build financially sustainable and impactful businesses.  

Shen’s work has been profiled by major media around the world in several languages by The New York Times, The Wall Street Journal, The Washington Post, ABC, CNN, BBC, CBS, NHK, TVB, The Guardian, Le Monde, Fortune, among others. Shen Tong is on Omnicom's sparks&honey Influencer Advisory Board, in addition to serving on boards and advisory boards for the Good Food Institute, Food Tank, and Poets & Writers, and as a member of NEXUS Global Summit. He founded FOOD-X in 2014. He also served as a venture partner of SOSV, a global multi-stage venture capital fund, after acting as general partner.

Humanitarian, political, and social activism
When the COVID-19 pandemic reached New York, The New York Times reported Shen's "just-in-time" relief efforts during the first weeks of the pandemic outbreak in New York through his private networks in March 2020.

In 2011, Shen supported the Occupy Wall Street Movement. He is considered a main proponent of nonviolence, social media movement, nationally coordinated organization working with broad alliances, and strategic messaging.

He co-chaired the committee on dialog with the government during the 1989 pro-democracy movement in China. He was on Changan Avenue when Chinese troops opened fire on the students. He had earlier obtained a Chinese passport to study biology at Brandeis University in Waltham, Massachusetts in the United States, so even though he was wanted by the Chinese government he was able to board a plane six days after the massacre on June 4, 1989. He was able to walk undisguised through police and security officials in the Beijing airport, possibly indicating broader support for the student democracy movement than the Chinese government contended at the time. Some of the biographical works about Shen Tong are Tiananmen Exiles and Standoff at Tiananmen.

Shortly after his arrival in the United States, Shen held a press conference at the Walker Center for Ecumenical Exchange in Newton, Massachusetts, giving the first detailed eye-witness account by a student leader of the Tiananmen Square massacre and of the events that led up to it.

During his studies in Massachusetts, he founded the Democracy for China Fund to support democratic movements in China and to promote ideas of political freedom and human rights.  Shen Tong also helped established Radio Free Asia with bipartisan efforts led by Senator Joe Biden in the 1990s. American NGO activist Marshall Strauss and program coordinator Juanita Scheyett-Cheng helped Shen found and operate the Fund. Coretta Scott King, John Kerry, Jeane Kirkpatrick, Nancy Pelosi, Kerry Kennedy, among other Western political and NGO figures and sinologists, were associated with Shen's organization in the 1990s.  The Congressional Human Rights Delegation to China in 1991 headed by Nancy Pelosi and Republican congressman John R. Miller was organized by the Democracy for China Fund with the help and funding from Hong Kong Democrats. His 1992 trip back to China led to his and his associates' arrest. He was released and immediately exiled after two months of imprisonment under mounting international pressure, particularly from the US Congress, the Presidential Campaign of Bill Clinton, the Vatican, and European governments. In May 1993, days before the renewal of China's Most Favored Nation trading status by the US government, Shen was scheduled to give a speech at the United Nations press club, but was barred by UN General Secretary Boutros Boutros-Ghali due to strong protest from the Chinese government.  He is known to be also associated with Chinese dissident activists and writers Liu Xiaobo, Wu'er Kaixi, Hu Ping, Ma Jian, Shi Tao, the Tibetan exile leader Dalai Lama, and the Taiwanese politician Ma Yingjiu. He is one of the narrators of the 2019 documentary Tiananmen: The People Versus the Party by PBS, BBC, and continental European TV networks.

Cultural activities
Shen served on the board of Food Tank since 2015 and Poets & Writers from 2008 to 2014. He studied biology at Brandeis University on a Wien Scholarship and later in doctorate programs in political philosophy at Harvard University and sociology at Boston University with Harvey Mansfield, Peter Berger, Daniel Bell, Samuel P. Huntington, and Michael Sandel.

In films and television, Shen has been an actor, producer, and film festival sponsor and speaker (including Tribeca Film Festival).  Shen Tong starred in Out of Exile with co-star Sharif Atkins in 2000. He worked with Arte, ABC News and Jean-François Bizot's Actuel magazine to produce Clandestins en Chine, including interviews with Jane Birkin, which premiered in a Paris theater and on Arte in 1992.  He co-starred with actress Hu Zongwen in a made-for-TV two parts movie, which received the 6th Fei Tian National Award in 1986. Shen also appeared in the 2022 documentary The Exiles, which won the Grand Jury Prize in Sundance 2022.

As a writer, he co-authored the book Almost a Revolution, published in 1990, a memoir of his life growing up in China and his experiences at the Tiananmen Square democracy movement. He carried on a diverse writing career with political commentary, scholarly essays, film critics, literary prose, and movie scripts in English and in Chinese, including publications in China under the pseudonym Rong Di. He holds honorary Ph.D. in 1991 from St. Ambrose University.

Shen also founded higher education and culture focused NGO in the mid-1990s, a center in Budapest for liberal scholars, journalists, writers, and educators studying transitional society with funding from Open Society Institute and Central European University of George Soros, a literature review magazine with Chinese dissident poets and writers with support from Allen Ginsberg, Susan Sontag, and Elie Wiesel.

Notes

External links

1968 births
Living people
1989 Tiananmen Square protesters
Brandeis University alumni
Businesspeople in software
Chinese dissidents
Chinese television producers
Male actors from New York (state)
Peking University alumni
Writers from Boston
Writers from New York (state)